Max Wenn (13 September 1926 – 22 September 2008) was an Australian rules footballer who played with Carlton in the Victorian Football League (VFL).

Notes

External links 

Max Wenn's profile at Blueseum

1926 births
Carlton Football Club players
2008 deaths
Australian rules footballers from Victoria (Australia)
Oakleigh Football Club players